Spine of God is the debut studio album by American rock band Monster Magnet, released in Europe in 1991 and in the United States the following year. The album represents one of the earliest examples of the emerging 1990s sub-genre of stoner rock. Though Spine of God did not perform well commercially upon its initial release, the album was listed on Spin magazine's "Ten Best Albums of the Year You Didn't Hear" for 1991. The song "Medicine" was released as a single with accompanying music video.

Overview
Spine of God features a cover of Grand Funk Railroad's "Sin's a Good Man's Brother". Spin magazine, in its December 1991 issue, referred to the album as "a total KO" while comparing it favorably to the work of grunge rock icons of the day such as Soundgarden, Tad, and Mudhoney.

Spine of God was re-released in March 2006 on Steamhammer records with new artwork, new liner notes, compressed dynamic range, and a previously unreleased demo version of "Ozium" included as a bonus track.

Track listing
All songs written by Dave Wyndorf unless noted otherwise.

Personnel

Musicians
 Dave Wyndorf – guitar, vocals
 John McBain – guitar
 Joe Calandra – bass
 Jon Kleiman – drums
 Tim Cronin – (credited, in typical Monster Magnet style, as "Dope/Lights/Center of the Universe")

Production
 Dave Wyndorf - producer 
 John McBain - producer
 Stacy "Springdale" Phelon – engineer

Art and design
 Rob Leecock – bullgod design
 Samantha Muccini – photography
 Reed Linkletter Jr. – art direction
 Alexander von Wieding – reissue artwork

References

Monster Magnet albums
1991 debut albums
Caroline Records albums